The Coach and Horses is a Grade II listed public house at 5 Hill Street, Mayfair, London. It dates from the 1740s.

There is another Coach and Horses pub in Mayfair, on Bruton Street.

References

Commercial buildings completed in the 18th century
Buildings and structures in Mayfair
Grade II listed pubs in the City of Westminster